Kaufmann Kohler (May 10, 1843 – January 28, 1926) was a German-born Jewish American biblical scholar and critic, theologian, Reform rabbi, and contributing editor to numerous articles of The Jewish Encyclopedia (1906).

Life and work
Kaufmann Kohler was born into a family of German Jewish rabbis in Fürth, Kingdom of Bavaria. He received his rabbinical training at Hassfurt, Höchberg near Würzburg, Mainz, Altona, and at Frankfurt am Main under Samson Raphael Hirsch, and his university training at Munich, Berlin, Leipzig, and Erlangen (Ph.D. 1868); his Ph.D. thesis, Der Segen Jacob's ("Jacob's Blessing"), was one of the earliest Jewish essays in the field of the higher criticism, and its radical character had the effect of closing to him the Jewish pulpit in Germany. Abraham Geiger, to whose Zeitschrift Kohler became a contributor at an early age, strongly influenced his career and directed his steps to the United States.  In 1869 he accepted a call to the pulpit of the Temple Beth-El in Detroit; in 1871 he became rabbi of Chicago Sinai Congregation. In 1879 he succeeded his father-in-law, David Einhorn, as rabbi of Temple Beth-El, New York City; his brother-in-law, Emil G. Hirsch, becoming his successor in Chicago.  Feb. 26, 1903, he was elected to the presidency of the Hebrew Union College, Cincinnati.

His son was attorney Max J. Kohler.

Reform movement 
From the time of his arrival in America, Kohler actively espoused the cause of Reform Judaism; he was one of the youngest members of the Philadelphia Jewish Rabbinical Conference of 1869, and in 1885 he convened the Pittsburgh Rabbinical Conference, which adopted the so-called "Pittsburgh Platform", on which Reform Judaism in America stands. While in Chicago he introduced Sunday lectures as supplementary to the regular Sabbath service. Kohler served for many years as president of the New York Board of Ministers, and was honorary president of the Central Conference of American Rabbis. He was editor-in-chief of the Sabbath Visito, a Jewish weekly for youth, from 1881 to 1882 and, with  I. S. Moses, and Emil G. Hirsch, "The Jewish Reformer," a weekly, devoted to the interests of Reform Judaism, in 1886. He was deeply interested in the "Jewish Chautauqua" movement. He was a keynote speaker at the 1893 World Parliament of Religions where he spoke about "Human Brotherhood as Taught by the Religions Based on the Bible". Shortly before his departure from New York in 1903 he delivered a series of six lectures at the Jewish Theological Seminary on "Apocryphal Literature".

He expressed doubts about the Pittsburgh Platform, stating in 1892:

We ought not be blind to the fact that Reform, with no other principle but that of progress and enlightenment has created a tendency to treat the past with irreverence and to trifle with the time-honored institutions and venerable sources of Judaism.

He went on to renounce Sunday services, which he had introduced, as "a patricide" undermining the holiness of the Sabbath.

Publications 
Kohler was always an active and prolific contributor to the Jewish and Semitic scientific press, European and American; among the periodicals to which he most frequently contributed scientific articles were Geiger's Zeitschrift, the journal of the German Oriental Society, Hebraica, the Jewish Quarterly Review, the Allgemeine Zeitung des Judenthums, the Jewish Times, the American Hebrew, Menorah Monthly, Zeitgeist, and Unity.

Among his published studies and lectures are:
 "On Capital Punishment" (1869);
 "The Song of Songs" (1877);
 "Backwards or Forwards," a series of lectures on Reform Judaism (1885);
 "Ethical Basis of Judaism" (1887);
 "Church and Synagogue in Their Mutual Relations" (1889);
 "A Guide to Instruction in Judaism" (1899)
 Jewish Theology, Systematically and Historically Considered (1918)
 The Origins of the Synagogue and the Church (1929 — posthumous)

He also edited the German collected writings of David Einhorn (1880). He also wrote important studies of Jesus and Paul.

Notes

References
 Who's Who in America, 1904;
 Isaac Markens, The Hebrews in America, 1888, pp. 288–289;
 American Jewish Year Book, 5664 (1903-1904);
 The American Hebrew, Sept. 18, 1891;
 Leon Hühner, in The Jewish Exponent, March 13, 1903.
 
 Shuly Rubin Schwartz. The Emergence of Jewish Scholarship in America: The Publication of the Jewish Encyclopedia. '' Monographs of the Hebrew Union College, Number 13. Cincinnati: Hebrew Union College Press, 1991.

External links

Chicago Sinai Congregation
Temple Beth El, Detroit
Kaufmann Kohler and the Rise of Reform Judaism in America
Jewish Theology Systematically and Historically Considered By Dr. K. Koeher 
 
 

1843 births
1926 deaths
19th-century Jewish biblical scholars
20th-century Jewish biblical scholars
American Jewish theologians
American male non-fiction writers
American Reform rabbis
Biblical criticism
Contributors to the Jewish Encyclopedia
German emigrants to the United States
German Jewish theologians
German male non-fiction writers
German Reform rabbis
Jewish ethicists
Rabbis from Cincinnati
Jews and Judaism in Manhattan
Rabbis from Chicago
Rabbis from New York City
Rabbis from Pennsylvania
20th-century American rabbis
19th-century American rabbis
Presidents of Hebrew Union College – Jewish Institute of Religion